Manuel Ignacio Acosta Gutiérrez (born 4 February 1977) is a Mexican politician from the Institutional Revolutionary Party. From 2009 to 2012 he served as Deputy of the LXI Legislature of the Mexican Congress representing Sonora.

See also 
 List of municipal presidents of Hermosillo

References

1977 births
Living people
People from Hermosillo
Politicians from Sonora
Members of the Chamber of Deputies (Mexico) for Sonora
Institutional Revolutionary Party politicians
Members of the Congress of Sonora
Universidad Iberoamericana alumni
21st-century Mexican politicians
University of Hermosillo alumni
Deputies of the LXI Legislature of Mexico